Tan Sri Loke Wan Tho (Pha̍k-fa-sṳ: Lu̍k Yun-thàu; 14 June 1915 – 20 June 1964) was a Malaysian-Singaporean business magnate, ornithologist, and photographer. He was the founder of Cathay Organisation in Singapore and Malaysia, and Motion Picture and General Investments Limited (MP&GI) in Hong Kong.

Early life and education
Born in Kuala Lumpur on 14 June 1915, Loke Wan Tho was the ninth child of Loke Yew, an ethnic Chinese businessman of Cantonese descent, and his wife of mixed Hokkien-Hakka ancestry named Loke Cheng Kim. 

Loke was only 2 years old when his father died. His early education was at Victoria Institution, Kuala Lumpur, a school set up by the British for Chinese boys which counted his father as one of its founders.

In 1929, due to his delicate health, Loke with his two younger sisters was taken by his mother to Chillon College in Montreux, Switzerland. He was the Swiss County (Vaud) long jump champion in 1932. Loke then went to King's College, Cambridge where he obtained an Honour's degree in English Literature and History in 1936. For a brief period after that, he was at the London School of Economics. Loke returned to Malaya just before the outbreak of the Second World War.

Biography 
In February 1942, Loke boarded a ship, Nora Moller, to leave Malaya to escape the Japanese but the ship was sank by a Japanese aircraft in the Strait of Bangka. He was rescued from the sea, temporarily blinded and severely burned. Later he was hospitalised in Batavia (Jakarta) and then evacuated to India. He survived his injuries and after arriving in Bombay, he was introduced to the Indian ornithologist Dr. Salim Ali, who eventually became a lifetime friend and a frequent companion on many major expeditions. Loke credited Salim who inspired his passion and wrote in his book A Company of Birds : "Under the guidance of an expert (Salim Ali) my interest in birds which hitherto had been but of a dilettante kind blossomed into a deeper passion." Later in 2014, Bombay Natural History Society, Mumbai published a coffee table book on Lokes collection of beautiful bird photographs as "Loke Wan Tho’s Birds" as a tribute to the man. A huge collection of his bird photographs is kept in the library of the Bombay Natural History Society at Mumbai.

Business career 
Although Loke had inherited a vast fortune of tin mines, plantations and properties from his father, he went on to grow the company which his mother had formed together with him in 1935 called Associated Theatres Ltd. The Pavilion Cinema in Kuala Lumpur and the Cathay Cinema in Singapore were built. Partnerships were forged with Ho Ah Loke and others to form the Cathay cinema circuit that counted 80 cinemas at its peak. Associated Theatres Ltd later changed its name to Cathay Organisation in 1959.

By 1953 Loke and Ho had started production of Malay films at the Cathay Keris Studios which were purpose built. Many a classic film has come from these studios located out in East Coast Road Singapore – Pontianak, Orang Minyak, Bawang Puteh Bawang Merah, Hang Tuah, Hang Jebat and many more.

Loke also bought over an existing film studio in Hong Kong in 1955 and started to produce a library of Chinese films to supply to his chain of cinemas which stretched from Singapore, Malaya and Borneo to Bangkok. The films were also distributed to the region and Cathay stars like Ge Lan, You Min, Lin Dai and Yeh Fung became household names in Indochina, Thailand, Burma, Hong Kong, Taiwan, Philippines, Indonesia, Brunei, Sarawak, Borneo and of course Singapore and Malaya.

The Cathay Organisation, of which Loke was its chairman, not only owned and operated cinemas and film studios, produced Malay and Chinese films but also owned and operated hotels and restaurants in Singapore (The Cathay Hotel and Ocean Park Hotel and their attendant restaurants) and Fiji (The Grand Pacific Hotel Suva and The Cathay Hotel Lautoka). He also had interests in rubber, palm oil and coconut plantations in Malaysia.

From the end of the war Loke had become increasingly caught up in the business world. Besides his own companies, he was Chairman of Malayan Airways Ltd, Singapore Telephone Board, Malayan Banking and was on the board of directors of numerous companies including Wearne Brothers, Sime Darby, Kwong Yik Bank, Great Eastern Life, H A O'Connors Ltd, Straits Steamship Co Ltd and Rediffusion (Singapore) Ltd.

In his lifetime Loke was honoured by the state of Kelantan in Malaysia from whom he received his Datoship, Cambodia, Japan and Malaya. Always the philanthropist he supported many charities, associations and educational institutions.

Personal life 
In September 1963, Loke married his third wife, Mavis Chew in London.

On 20 June 1964, Loke and his wife were killed in the crash of Civil Air Transport Flight B-908, along with his chief executives, leaving Taichung after attending the 11th Asian Film Festival.

Honour

Honour of Malaya
  : 
 Commander of the Order of the Defender of the Realm (P.M.N.) - Tan Sri (1961)

Memorials

 Loke Wan Tho Photography Exhibit is housed on 3rd floor of Singapore Photography Society
 Loke Wan Tho Library in Singapore Jurong Bird Park
 Wan Tho Avenue in Potong Pasir, Singapore
 Loke Wan Tho Star, No. 38 Avenue of Stars, Hong Kong
 Museum open to the public housed on 2nd floor of The Cathay

Publications
A Company of Birds. Michael Joseph, London 1959
 Angkor, by Malcolm MacDonald and Loke Wan Tho, Jonathan Cape, London, 1958,59,60.
Text by Malcolm MacDonald, with chapters including "The History of Khmers"。"The Ruins of Khmers"。
111 Black and White Plates of Angkor Wat, taken by Loke Wan Tho and M.MacDonald。

References

External links

Black Naped Tern, photograph by Loke Wan Tho
Cinema Magnate, Ornithologist, Philanthropist
Cathay Organisation
Victoria Institution
Loke Wan Tho map collection at the National Library of Australia

1915 births
Malaysian people of Hokkien descent
Malaysian people of Chinese descent
1964 deaths
Malaysian chief executives
Malaysian emigrants to Singapore
Malaysian people of Cantonese descent
Naturalised citizens of Singapore
Singaporean art patrons
Singaporean chief executives
Singaporean people of Cantonese descent
Singaporean ornithologists
Malaysian people of Hakka descent
Singaporean photographers
People from Kuala Lumpur
Victims of aviation accidents or incidents in 1964
Victims of aviation accidents or incidents in Taiwan
20th-century zoologists
Commanders of the Order of the Defender of the Realm
20th-century philanthropists